This is a list of football clubs in Sweden. For women's football clubs, see the list of women's football clubs in Sweden.

League listings 

 Allsvenskan
 Superettan
 Division 1
 Division 1 Norra
 Division 1 Södra
 Division 2
 Division 3
 Division 4
 Division 5
 Division 6
 Division 7
 Division 8

Alphabetical listings 

Contents: A B C D E F G H I J K L M N O P Q R S T U V W X Y Z Å Ä Ö

B 

See also:

Footnotes

References